Arkansas Highway 73 (AR 73 and Hwy. 73) is a designation for two state highways in South Arkansas. The western route of  runs from US 278 north to Highway 355. An eastern alignment runs  from US 67 in east Hope to Arkansas Highway 53.

Route description

Western segment
Highway 73 begins in Hempstead County at Highway 355 near Millwood Lake, close to the Howard County line. The route briefly enters Howard County before reentering Hempstead County near Columbus and the Columbus Presbyterian Church. Highway 73 runs along the southern border of the Rick Evans Grandview Prairie Wildlife Management Area past the Grandison D. Royston House before intersecting Highway 195 at Cross Roads. The route continues further southeast through rural country before terminating at US 278.

The route is a low traffic road with less than 1000 vehicles per day (VPD) from its western terminus to the junction with Highway 195. East of the intersection the Average daily traffic (ADT) increases to about 1300 VPD (as of 2010).

Eastern segment
The route begins at US 67 in the eastern portion of Hope. Highway 73 runs east through Rocky Mound into Nevada County. The route runs only briefly in the county before terminating at Highway 53. The route is two–lane undivided for its entire length.

The route begins with an average of 2400 vehicles per day from US 67 in Hope to the intersection with Lake Shore Street, which provides access to William Jefferson Clinton Primary School (as of 2010). East of the school the route's ADT drops to approximately 900 VPD; ADT drops further to 120 VPD upon entering Nevada County.

History

Highway 73 was an original 1926 state highway, which is the first year Arkansas numbered its highways in a traditional format. The route ran from Highway 55 near Albrook east to Highway 4 in Hope, and was mostly graveled. Highway 55 was renumbered to Highway 355 around 1958 in anticipation of Interstate 55 in northeast Arkansas. This is due to Arkansas conventions to only use each number once among Interstates, US highways, and state highways. Highway 4 was replaced by US 278 across the state in 1998.

Major intersections

See also

 List of state highways in Arkansas

References

External links

073
Transportation in Hempstead County, Arkansas
Transportation in Howard County, Arkansas
Transportation in Nevada County, Arkansas
Hope micropolitan area